Dobroteşti may refer to several places in Romania:

 Dobroteşti, a commune in Dolj County
 Dobroteşti, a commune in Teleorman County

See also 
 Dobre (disambiguation)
 Dobra (disambiguation)
 Dobrin (disambiguation)
 Dobrușa (disambiguation)
 Dobrești (disambiguation)
 Dobrescu (surname)